JDI may refer to:

 J. D. Irving
 Japan Display Inc
 Jaring Data Interaktif
 Java Debugger Interface
 Job Descriptive Index
 Job's Daughters International
 Jugend debattiert international
 UCL Jill Dando Institute